The Flores–Lembata languages are a group of related Austronesian languages (geographically Central–Eastern Malayo-Polynesian languages) spoken in the Lesser Sundas, on eastern Flores and small islands immediately east of Flores, Indonesia. They are suspected of having a non-Austronesian substratum, with extreme morphological simplification in Sika and secondarily in Alorese, but not to a greater extent than the Central Malayo-Polynesian languages in general.

Languages
The generally accepted defined Flores–Lembata languages are:
Kedang
Sika
Lamaholot
In addition, the following is often grouped either as a dialect of Lamaholot or its own language:
Adonara
Alorese

Lamaholot is a dialect chain. Ethnologue treats ten varieties as distinct languages.

Classification
Elias (2017) proposes the following internal classification of Flores-Lembata.
Flores-Lembata
Sika-Hewa
Sika
Hewa
Kedang-Lamaholot
Kedang
Lamaholot
Central Lamaholot
Eastern-Western Lamaholot
Eastern Lamaholot
Alorese-Western Lamaholot
Alorese
Western Lamaholot

Linguistic areas are:
East Lembata: Kedan, Eastern Lamaholot
Sedentary Lembata: Eastern Lamaholot, Alorese, Western Lamaholot, Central Lamaholot

See also
Central Flores languages

References

Further reading

External links
LexiRumah (part of the Lesser Sunda linguistic databases)
Reconstructing the past through languages of the present: the Lesser Sunda Islands

Languages of Indonesia
 
Flores Island (Indonesia)
Solor Archipelago